House Broken may refer to:

 House Broken (1936 film), a British film
 House Broken (2009 film), an American film
 House Broken, a 2016 live album by Pavlov's Dog
HouseBroken, a 2021 American animated series